This is a partial list of Korean-language films:

0-9

A

B

C

D

E

F

G

H

I

J

K

L

M

N

O

P

Q

R

S

T

U

V

W

X

Y

Z

See also
Contemporary culture of South Korea
Contemporary culture of North Korea
List of Korean films of 1919–1948
List of North Korean films
List of South Korean films

Lists of films by language